Fenwick Island is a barrier island along the Atlantic Ocean in Delaware and Maryland in the United States. It contains the communities of South Bethany and Fenwick Island in Delaware along with Ocean City, Maryland. Until 1933, it was attached to Assateague Island to the south. That year, a hurricane carved an inlet between the two landforms, which was made permanent.  If not for the Assawoman Canal, constructed by the U.S. Army Corps of Engineers in 1891, the island would be attached to the mainland of Delaware.

References

Barrier islands of Delaware
Barrier islands of Maryland
Landforms of Sussex County, Delaware
Landforms of Worcester County, Maryland
Spits of the United States
Islands of Maryland